Beloye is a rural locality (a selo) and the administrative center of Belovsky Selsoviet, Altaysky District, Altai Krai, Russia. The population was 228 as of 2013. There are 12 streets.

Geography 
Beloye is located 44 km south of Altayskoye (the district's administrative centre) by road. Bulukhta is the nearest rural locality.

References 

Rural localities in Altaysky District, Altai Krai